Pontin or Pontins may refer to:

People
 Constans Pontin (1819–1852), Swedish author
 Fred Pontin (1906–2000), British businessman
 Jason Pontin (born 1967), British-American journalist
 Keith Pontin (born 1956), Welsh association football player

Other uses
 Pontins, holiday parks operator, founded by Fred Pontin
 International Open Series, also known as Pontins International Open Series
 Les Pontins, a high mountain pass in Switzerland
 Avang, a native boat of the Ivatan people in the Philippines also known as "Pontin"